Dougezhuang Area is an area and township located on the southern part of Chaoyang District, Beijing, China. It borders Gaobeidian and Sanjianfang Townships to the north, Guanzhuang and Heizhuanghu Townships to the east, Taihu Town to the south, Fatou Subdistrict, Wangsiying and Shibalidian Townships to the west. It has a population of 53,766 as of 2020.

The name of this area, Dougezhuang was historically the residence of Dou family, and later got corrupted to the name used today.

History

Administrative Divisions 
As of 2021, the 24 subdivisions of Dougezhuang were administered as 12 communities and 12 villages:

See also 
 List of township-level divisions of Beijing

References

Chaoyang District, Beijing
Areas of Beijing